Ambattur is located in northwestern part of Chennai City, in Ambattur taluk of the Chennai District, surrounded by Avadi, Anna Nagar, Padi, Mogappair, Kallikuppam, Surapet, Korattur, Ayappakkam, Athipet and Thiruverkadu. The neighbourhood is served by Ambattur railway station of the Chennai Suburban Railway. Ambattur has its origins in a village of the same name which can be located at present as areas opposite to Ambattur telephone exchange. Ambattur was a village with large extents of agricultural farm lands irrigated by the once-sprawling Ambattur Lake. In 2011, the neighbourhood had a population 466,205.

Etymology
This place is one of 108 Shakthi Sthals in the country. The Amman temple (for the Hindu deity Durga) here is the fifty-first in the order, giving the locality the Tamil name "aimbaththu onraam oor" (ஐம்பத்து ஒன்றாம் ஊர்), meaning fifty-first place/temple village, which later transmuted as Ambattur. The goddess is worshiped in the form of Vaishnavi.

Ambattur is also called so because it was a collaboration of 51 small towns (ambathu onraam oor in Tamil), from which the name Ambattur was derived.

History
Along with Avadi, Sembium, Ennore and Tiruvottriyur, Ambattur is part of the "auto belt" in the city's industrial north and west regions that developed when the automobile industry developed in Madras, in the early post-World War II years. Sir Ivan Stedeford, chairman of Tube Investments, United Kingdom, was instrumental in starting the TI factory and TII complex in the country. Sir Ivan signed a joint venture agreement with A. M. Murugappa Chettiar of the Murugappa Group, which was then a small business house manufacturing sandpaper and abrasives for the war effort and also trading war surplus. It was the first joint venture agreement to be signed in South India after Independence. This resulted in the establishment of the TI Cycle factory in a mango grove in Ambattur by 1951, and manufacture of the 'Hercules India' bicycle soon began. By 1954, the word 'India' was dropped from the name when international quality standards were met.

In 1954, Sir Ivan signed his second joint venture, Tube Products India, with the Murugappa family. The factory was established on what had been the British Government of Malaya's Immigration Camp. By 1956, production was started in the new factory and soon resulted in the establishment of other TI factories in the Ambattur-Avadi industrial stretch. This led to a rapid growth in population in the region and several public amenities were established in Ambattur by TI company, such as the Sir Ramaswamy Mudaliar Higher Secondary School (named after the person who had initially introduced the partners to each other), a post office and a bank. When the growing population demanded a hospital, the company established one between Ambattur and Avadi in 1966 from a gift of around £5,000 from Sir Ivan. The hospital was named the Sir Ivan Stedeford Hospital in his honour.

Geography

Waterbodies

Ambattur has two main waterbodies, namely the Ambattur Eri and the Chithu Oragadam Lake and the bigger Puzhal eri on the outskirts. The upkeep of the Ambattur Eri is plagued by problems such as dumping of garbage, water mining and construction of buildings and the Chithu Oragadam (Thangal) Eri suffers due to pollution by sewage. The local body generates nearly 250 tonnes of garbage daily.

Ambattur has a stormwater drain network of 177.95 km, the largest of the eight zones newly added to the Corporation of Chennai in 2011.

Flora and Fauna 
Several species of birds reside and frequent the places in and around Ambattur. Woodland birds, water birds and many more visit here.

Demographics

According to the 2011 census, Ambattur had a population of 466,205 with a sex-ratio of 985 females for every 1,000 males, much above the national average of 929. A total of 48,444 were under the age of six, constituting 24,829 males and 23,615 females. Scheduled Castes and Scheduled Tribes accounted for 11.49% and 0.33% of the population, respectively. The average literacy of the town was 82.61%, compared with the national average of 72.99%. The town had 120,248 households. There were 184,390 workers, comprising 1,252 cultivators, 1,128 main agricultural labourers, 2,467 in house hold industries, 159,242 other workers, 20,301 marginal workers, 507 marginal cultivators, 453 marginal agricultural labourers, 641 marginal workers in household industries and 18,700 other marginal workers. As per the religious census of 2011, Ambattur had 86.53% Hindus, 3.68% Muslims, 8.95% Christians, 0.05% Sikhs, 0.04% Buddhists, 0.17% Jains, 0.57% following other religions and 0.01% following no religion or did not indicate any religious preference.

During 2001–2011, Ambattur registered a population growth of 49.9%.

Administration
Ambattur comes under the Sriperumbudur Parliamentary constituency. It was previously under the North Chennai parliamentary constituency, and, along with Villivakkam, it was the largest assembly constituency in India. The Fame organisation sangam originated here. The delimitation process of assembly constituencies had given Ambattur a new identity of its own: Constituency No. 8, Tamil Nadu.  Once a major panchayat, Ambattur was made a township in the 1960s and a selection-grade municipality from April 1975. In May 1992, it was raised to special-grade municipality. It was a municipality till October 2011. It had been divided into 52 wards. Ambattur Municipality included Padi, Korattur, Mogappair, Nolambur, kallikuppam, Ayapakkam TNHB, Athipet, Udaiyarpalayam and the Ambattur Industrial Estate areas.

On 15 June 2011, the Chief Minister of Tamil Nadu submitted a memorandum to the Prime Minister of India to expand the city limits of Chennai by which the Ambattur Municipality would come under the new scheme.

Since 2011, it is part of Chennai Corporation as Zone 7 with 15 wards (Ward Nos. 79 to 91, 93).

Amenities
Sir Ivan Stedeford Hospital is in this area.

Library
The Branch Library, as it is now called, was opened in May 1971 by the then Minister of Education and Local Administration V. R. Nedunchezhiyan. It was earlier known as Murugappa Library, as the building it is housed in belongs to the A.M.M. Charities Trust. The library is situated near Perunthalaivar Kamarajar Government Girls Higher Secondary School (Girl's High School).

Economy
The economy of Ambattur is mainly industrial. It was well known as an auto ancillary hub. However, in the late 2000s many IT companies have come up in Ambattur.

Ambattur Industrial Estate

The Ambattur Industrial Estate, spread over an area of 1,430 acres (4.9 km2), houses about 1,800 units and is the biggest small scale industrial estate in South Asia. It was commissioned in the year 1964 by the Government of Tamil Nadu. Companies like Britannia Industries, TI Cycles of India, Dunlop, and TVS have their plants in Ambattur. Tata Communications has its satellite earth station at the Ambattur–Red Hills road, known as wireless among the locals. Jaya TV, Vijay TV, Asianet and Kairali relay signals from this facility. The Heavy Vehicles Factory (HVF) in Avadi, which manufactures military tanks, is just 5 km from this place, adding to its importance. A railway concrete sleeper manufacturing company is located near the Ambattur railway station. Textile industries such as Ambattur Clothing Limited (ACL) and Bombay Fashions have their facilities here and employ thousands of women. The units in the Industrial Estate generate a combined annual revenue of over  35,000 million.

The Industrial Estate has a bus terminus. The Ambattur Estate terminus and the maintenance centre with a capacity of 100 buses were opened in 1967. However, the centre handles 125 buses a day, with a staff count of 1,100.

IT parks

Ambattur Industrial Estate has attracted a lot of IT companies due to its proximity to residential neighbourhoods and the lower rentals. The lease rentals of IT Parks in Ambattur are half of those in the city. Information Technology (IT) companies such as MilesTs, HCL Technologies, Dell and Tata Consultancy Services have their development centres here. Out of the 22 facilities that HCL Technologies has in Chennai, six are in Ambattur. There are also a few BPO centres such as Perot Systems, Telebuy, Polaris BPO, Serco, First Source & iOPEX Technologies. Prince Info Park, Kochar Technology Park, Ambit IT Park. Now that 10 acres commercial building is bought by Indiabulls Securities Ltd for Rs 600 crores and renamed it as One IndiaBulls Park, current occupiers of the complex include Royal Bank of Scotland, Kone, Britannia Industries, Ajuba, Covenant, Telebuy, Ibox, Bean Balls, Germany's Modisch, Yes Bank and Etisalat. One IndiaBulls park is one of the major IT parks in Ambattur. As a remarkable mile stone, CMA CGM, world's 3rd largest liner started their documentation centre along with Regional eCommerce Team in AMBIT park.

However, the demand for commercial space in Ambattur is not as robust as Rajiv Gandhi Salai which is marketed extensively by the government. While IT and ITeS firms in Ambattur have brought in a new image to the industrial belt that has been known for its garment and auto-ancillary units, it has increased the real estate prices.

Transport

Road
The Chennai-Tiruvallur High Road (CTH Road or NH205) passes through Ambattur and the Chennai-Kolkata highway is just about 8 km puzhal from the place making it a strategic location. On an average, about 40,000 passenger car units use the CTH Road. The new Chennai Bypass road between Maduravoyal and puzhal passes through Ambattur Industrial Estate. It connects NH4 with NH5 and NH205 via Ambattur Industrial Estate.

The Ambattur bus terminus is located adjacent to the MTH Road and has MTC (city buses) connecting Ambattur with various points in Chennai city. Ambattur does not have a proper bus terminus despite being one of the biggest localities of Chennai. A lot of buses from Avadi and the outskirts of Chennai also pass through Ambattur, offering good connectivity. There are also a few buses operating to Nagercoil, Tirunelveli, Madurai, Vellore and other parts of Tamil Nadu from here. Buses to the famous pilgrim centre of Tirupathi can also be availed from Ambattur.

On 4 October 2013, the Tamil Nadu Highways department issued a GO extending the entire stretch of the road till Tirutani to 6 lanes at a cost of  1,680 million, by means of land acquisition from 12 villages. In the first phase, the road will be widened to 100 ft (4 lanes) with centre median at a cost of  980 million.

Rail
The Chennai Central-Arakkonam railway line passes through Ambattur and has two railway stations in the neighbourhood. Ambattur railway station serves the residential areas and Pattaravakkam railway station serves the Ambattur Industrial Estate, kallikuppam and Karruku neighbourhood areas. Suburban Broad Gauge EMU trains operate daily from Chennai Central and Chennai Beach to Avadi, Tiruvallur, Patabiram Military Siding, Arakkonam, Vellore, Tirupathi, and Tiruttani via Ambattur.  By rail, Ambattur is 30 minutes from Chennai Central, 15 minutes from Perambur and 07 minutes from Villivakkam. Many fast EMU locals (suburban trains) towards Tiruvallur, Arakkonam and Tiruttani, stop at Ambattur railway station, But fast local trains towards Chennai central do not halt at Ambattur because non availability of platform in fast line. By fast local train it takes 15 minutes from Chennai Central. Ambattur having Passenger Reservation Centre Timing 8.00Hrs to14.00Hrs. There is a pending request to extension of Platform length to accommodate express trains, Increase timing of Passenger Reservation Centre, subway, and overbridge at Ambattur

Sports
Kannan Theatre near Senthil Nagar was closed and converted to Dolphin Sports Academy. 

The Ambattur Badminton Association has constructed an indoor stadium ( Kamalam John Samuel Indoor Stadium) name after the Late parents of JCD PRABHAKAR, for playing shuttle badminton, located near the TI Cycles of India factory.

Parks
Parks include Pudur park (Old Pond) near menambedu, Thangal Lake Park near Anjalamaram, Krishnapuram Corporation Park (renovated in October 2009) and the Thiruvengada Nagar Corporation Park (opened on 11 October 2013), Venkatapuram Park at Kubera Vinayagar Temple Ground (opened in 2014), Greater Chennai Corporation Park - VGN Shanthi Nagar, Ambattur, ICF Emp. Colony Park at Ayapakkam. There are many parks in Ambattur which people can use for recreational activities.

Media
South Indian Post leading bilingual (English and Tamil) newspaper, Town News, Seithi Mazhai, My Vyapar is the leading bilingual (English and Tamil) newspaper. The Neighbour City and Kutty News are the newspapers in Tamil. Ambattur Talk is in English.

Educational institutions

Schools

Colleges

LIC Zonal Training Centre
Ambattur also houses the Chennai Zonal Training Center of Life Insurance Corporation of India, located near prithvipakkam.

References

External links

 Ambattur

Cities and towns in Chennai district